Henk Lauwers is a classical baritone singer (lyric baritone), born in Ypres, Belgium in 1956.

As a very young boy soprano Lauwers performed under direction of Benjamin Britten his War Requiem. Later he studied classical flute but gained international fame as a classical baritone singer. One of his most notable performances has been his live interpretation of Eight Songs for a Mad King by Peter Maxwell Davies in a Transparent Muziektheater production directed by Ian Burton.

Performances
 "Maria de Buenos Aires", Ástor Piazzolla, tango-operita with Rudolf Werthen, Covent Garden Festival 2000, Hong Kong Arts Festival 2001,  Chiang Kai-shek, Taiwan 2002,  L'Arsénal, Metz 2004 and L'Opéra, Avignon
 "Flamma Flamma", Nicholas Lens, Contemporary Art Museum, Cologne, chamber version with Frank Sheppard, Zeger Vandersteene, Gudrun Vercampt, Geert Callaert
 "Je Pleure des Bananes", Arne Sierens
 "Torre de Canela", Federico García Lorca – Hans Rotman with Sinfonietta Nova Arnstadt and Opera Mobile,  Weimar, Düsseldorf
 "Cantate aux étoiles", André Waignien
 "Jonker Lichthart", Jef Van Hoof
 "Weihnachtsoratorium", Bach, I Fiamminghi
 "Ulrike", Raoul Desmet
 "De Grote Verzoeking van Sint-Antonius", Louis De Meester
  "Welp-Urt", opera,  Johan Desmet
 "Ikh bin keyn eydes nit gevezn," ("The Puppet Designer"), Nicholas Lens with Rudolf Werthen, I Fiamminghi, Paradiso, Amsterdam
 "Don Giovanni", Mozart, I Fiamminghi
 "L'Inganno Felice", Rossini, stage direction Harry Kümmel
 "Empedocles' Turm", Cees Nooteboom, Hans Rotman with Sinfonia Amsterdam, Angermuseum in Erfurt
 "Des Esels Schatten", Richard Strauss, Opera Mobile
 "Terra Terra", Nicholas Lens, Hamburg with The Stuttgarter Kammerorchester, Claron McFadden, LaVerne Williams, Frank Sheppard, Le Mystère des Voix Bulgares
 "8 songs for a Mad King," Peter Maxwell Davies with Transparent, Prometheus, Etienne Siebens, Ian Burton

Awards 
 Prize Alpaerts for Chamber Music
 Prize Emmu Luart
 Finalist Bellini-concours
 Prize Victor Ligley 1997 for contribution to contemporary work

Recordings 
(labels Antler, Naxos, Erato, Classic Talent, Sony BMG, Ariola Classic)
 "Het Iepersch Liedboek" (Songbook from Ypres)
 "Musiques pour Marie-Thérèse", M.A. Charpentier
 "Orrori dell’Amore", Nicholas Lens with Claron McFadden
 "Manon Lescaut,"  Puccini
 "Torre de Canela", García Lorca
 "De Grote Verzoeking van Sint-Antonius", Louis De Meester,
 "The Accacha Chronicles", Nicholas Lens with Derek Lee Ragin, Claron McFadden, Ian Honeyman, Jean-Paul Fauchécourt
  'Wilt thou be my dearie", Leopold Kozeluch with Diane Andersen, pianoforte.

References

Sources
Muziekcentrum Vlaanderen, Biography: Henk Lauwers 
McCants, Clyde T., Opera for libraries: a guide to core works, audio and video recordings, books and serials, McFarland, 2003.

External links
Official website

1956 births
Living people
Belgian classical flautists
Belgian male singers
Belgian opera singers
Musicians from Ypres